Jonathan I. Lunine (born June 26, 1959) is an American planetary scientist and physicist. Lunine teaches at Cornell University, where he is the David C. Duncan Professor in the Physical Sciences and Chair of the Department of Astronomy. Having published more than 380 research papers, Lunine is at the forefront of research into planet formation, evolution, and habitability. His work includes analysis of brown dwarfs, gas giants, and planetary satellites. Within the Solar System, bodies with potential organic chemistry and prebiotic conditions, particularly Saturn's moon Titan, have been the focus of Lunine's research.

Lunine is the David Baltimore Distinguished Visiting Scientist at NASA's Jet Propulsion Laboratory. He is an interdisciplinary scientist on the Cassini mission to Saturn, and on the James Webb Space Telescope, as well as co-investigator on the Juno mission launched in 2011 to Jupiter.  He is the Principal Investigator of a proposed astrobiology mission to Enceladus called Enceladus Life Finder.

Lunine is a member of the U.S. National Academy of Sciences, a fellow of the American Association for the Advancement of Science and the American Geophysical Union, and a member of the International Academy of Astronautics, which gave him its Basic Science Award in 2009. In 2015 he was awarded the Jean Dominique Cassini medal of the European Geosciences Union. He earned a B.S. in Physics and Astronomy from the University of Rochester in 1980, followed by M.S. (1983) and Ph.D. (1985) degrees in Planetary Science from the California Institute of Technology.

Lunine was raised Jewish, but is a convert to Catholicism who helped found the Society of Catholic Scientists. He also delivered a lecture on Georges Lemaître.

Selected publications

Technical books
 Earth: Evolution of a Habitable World, 2nd Edition (Cambridge University Press, 2013)
 Astrobiology: A Multidisciplinary Approach (Pearson Addison-Wesley, 2005)

Scholarly articles

References

See also 
 Theoretical planetology

Living people
University of Arizona faculty
Planetary scientists
21st-century American physicists
American astronomers
University of Rochester alumni
California Institute of Technology alumni
1959 births
Members of the United States National Academy of Sciences
Fellows of the American Geophysical Union
Astrobiologists
20th-century American Jews
American Roman Catholics
Converts to Roman Catholicism from Judaism
21st-century American Jews
Cornell University faculty